West Wildwood is a borough in Cape May County, in the U.S. state of New Jersey. It is part of the Ocean City metropolitan statistical area. As of the 2020 United States census, the borough's population was 540, a decrease of 63 (−10.4%) from the 2010 census count of 603, which in turn reflected an increase of 155 (+34.6%) from the 448 counted in the 2000 census. The summer population grows to as much as 5,000.

West Wildwood was incorporated as a borough by an act of the New Jersey Legislature on April 21, 1920, from portions of Middle Township.

Geography
According to the United States Census Bureau, the borough had a total area of 0.36 square miles (0.94 km2), including 0.29 square miles (0.74 km2) of land and 0.08 square miles (0.20 km2) of water (21.67%).

The borough borders the Cape May County municipalities of Middle Township, North Wildwood City and Wildwood City.

Located on a small island connected to Wildwood by a two-lane bridge, the borough consists primarily vacation and year-round homes with a single night club, a miniature golf course and several marinas. Created using landfill to cover existing marshes in the 1920s, the borough is surrounding by bulkheads to protect it from flooding, though heavy winds and high tides can overtop the flood protection mechanisms.

Demographics

2010 census

The Census Bureau's 2006–2010 American Community Survey showed that (in 2010 inflation-adjusted dollars) median household income was $38,750 (with a margin of error of +/− $10,914) and the median family income was $57,981 (+/− $16,263). Males had a median income of $36,607 (+/− $10,003) versus $36,364 (+/− $10,046) for females. The per capita income for the borough was $27,606 (+/− $4,119). About 6.7% of families and 8.9% of the population were below the poverty line, including 7.5% of those under age 18 and 6.5% of those age 65 or over.

2000 census
As of the 2000 United States census there were 448 people, 202 households, and 117 families residing in the borough. There were 775 housing units at an average density of 1, 150.9/km2 (2,937.4/sq mi). The racial makeup of the borough was 95.76% White, 0.22% Asian, 2.23% from other races, and 1.79% from two or more races. Hispanic or Latino of any race were 3.79% of the population.

There were 202 households, out of which 20.8% had children under the age of 18 living with them, 46.0% were married couples living together, 9.4% had a female householder with no husband present, and 41.6% were non-families. 36.6% of all households were made up of individuals, and 17.3% had someone living alone who was 65 years of age or older. The average household size was 2.22 and the average family size was 2.92.

In the borough the population was spread out, with 18.8% under the age of 18, 5.4% from 18 to 24, 23.7% from 25 to 44, 32.8% from 45 to 64, and 19.4% who were 65 years of age or older. The median age was 47 years. For every 100 females, there were 93.9 males. For every 100 females age 18 and over, there were 88.6 males.

The median income for a household in the borough was $33,393, and the median income for a family was $50,625. Males had a median income of $38,281 versus $21,190 for females. The per capita income for the borough was $17,839. About 3.2% of families and 6.5% of the population were below the poverty line, including 13.4% of those under age 18 and 5.6% of those age 65 or over.

Economy
Portions of the borough—together with areas in North Wildwood, Wildwood and Wildwood Crest—are part of a joint Urban Enterprise Zone (UEZ), one of 32 zones covering 37 municipalities statewide. The four municipalities in The Wildwoods were selected in 2002 as one of a group of three zones added to participate in the program as part of a joint zone with. In addition to other benefits to encourage employment and investment within the Zone, shoppers can take advantage of a reduced 3.3125% sales tax rate (half of the % rate charged statewide) at eligible merchants. Established in November 2002, the borough's Urban Enterprise Zone status expires in December 2023. The joint UEZ is overseen by the Enterprise Zone Development Corporation of the Wildwoods Board, which includes representatives from all four municipalities.

Government

Local government
West Wildwood has been governed under the Walsh Act form of New Jersey municipal government since 1964. The borough is one of 71 municipalities (of the 564) statewide that use the commission form of government. The governing body is comprised of three commissioners, who are elected at-large on a non-partisan basis to serve concurrent four-year terms of office as part of the November general election. At a reorganization meeting conducted after each election, the commission selects one of its members to serve as mayor and designates for each commissioner an assigned department to oversee.

, members of the West Wildwood Borough Board of Commissioners are 
Mayor Matthew J. Ksiazek (Commissioner of Public Works, Parks and Public Property),   
John J. Banning (Commissioner of Public Safety and Public Affairs), 
Joseph D. Segrest (Commissioner of Revenue and Finance), all serving terms of office ending December 31, 2024.

In June 2019, Cornelius J. Maxwell (who had been serving as Commissioner of Revenue and Finance) resigned from office, citing personal reasons. The meeting where Maxwell resigned was the first following the disclosure of ethics fines of nearly $25,000—the largest in state history by the board—that had been assessed by the Local Finance Board against Mayor Fox relating to his actions on behalf of Police Chief Jacqueline Ferentz. In November 2019, Amy Korbellis was elected to fill the vacant seat.

In the same May 2012 election in which the three incumbent commissioners were elected, the voters approved a ballot question shifting elections from May to November, extending the terms of the three elected commissioners by an additional six months, with the next municipal election taking place in November 2016.

Federal, state and county representation
West Wildwood is located in the 2nd Congressional District and is part of New Jersey's 1st state legislative district.

Politics
As of March 2011, there were a total of 463 registered voters in West Wildwood, of which 124 (26.8%) were registered as Democrats, 184 (39.7%) were registered as Republicans and 154 (33.3%) were registered as Unaffiliated. There was one voter registered to another party.

In the 2012 presidential election, Democrat Barack Obama received 51.6% of the vote (165 cast), ahead of Republican Mitt Romney with 48.1% (154 votes), and other candidates with 0.3% (1 vote), among the 323 ballots cast by the borough's 459 registered voters (3 ballots were spoiled), for a turnout of 70.4%. In the 2008 presidential election, Republican John McCain received 52.4% of the vote (177 cast), ahead of Democrat Barack Obama, who received 45.0% (152 votes), with 338 ballots cast among the borough's 462 registered voters, for a turnout of 73.2%. In the 2004 presidential election, Democrat John Kerry received 51.4% of the vote (171 ballots cast), outpolling Republican George W. Bush, who received 47.1% (157 votes), with 333 ballots cast among the borough's 422 registered voters, for a turnout percentage of 78.9.

In the 2013 gubernatorial election, Republican Chris Christie received 75.4% of the vote (175 cast), ahead of Democrat Barbara Buono with 23.3% (54 votes), and other candidates with 1.3% (3 votes), among the 236 ballots cast by the borough's 435 registered voters (4 ballots were spoiled), for a turnout of 54.3%. In the 2009 gubernatorial election, Republican Chris Christie received 48.2% of the vote (148 ballots cast), ahead of both Democrat Jon Corzine with 41.7% (128 votes) and Independent Chris Daggett with 4.9% (15 votes), with 307 ballots cast among the borough's 493 registered voters, yielding a 62.3% turnout.

Education

Public school students from West Wildwood, a non-operating school district, attend Margaret Mace School in North Wildwood, of the North Wildwood School District, for grades PreK–8 and Wildwood High School of Wildwood City School District for ninth grade through twelfth grade as part of a sending/receiving relationship. In 2019, North Wildwood district received 20 students from West Wildwood, making up 11% of the North Wildwood district enrollment.

As of the 2021–22 school year, the district, comprised of one school, had an enrollment of 207 students and 33.0 classroom teachers (on an FTE basis), for a student–teacher ratio of 6.3:1. As of the 2021–22 school year, the high school had an enrollment of 263 students and 31.0 classroom teachers (on an FTE basis), for a student–teacher ratio of 8.5:1.

Students are also eligible to attend Cape May County Technical High School in the Cape May Court House area, which serves students from the entire county in its comprehensive and vocational programs, which are offered without charge to students who are county residents. Special needs students may be referred to Cape May County Special Services School District in the Cape May Court House area.

In 2020, the West Wildwood School Board commissioned a study from Stockton University exploring whether switching K–8 education to the Wildwood School District would have effects, causing a negative reaction from multiple parents who preferred that their children attend Mace School. The study stated that West Wildwood would save more than $175,000 per year if it used Wildwood City district for K–8.

Transportation

County Route 614 (Glenwood Avenue) runs through the borough to its northern tip.

References

External links

 West Wildwood Borough website
 The Wildwood Leader, covering West Wildwood.

 
1920 establishments in New Jersey
Boroughs in Cape May County, New Jersey
New Jersey District Factor Group none
New Jersey Urban Enterprise Zones
Populated places established in 1920
The Wildwoods, New Jersey
Walsh Act